Fabrice Lepaul (17 November 1976 – 23 May 2020) was a French professional footballer who played as a striker. He was a squad member for the 1993 UEFA European Under-16 Championship.

Lepaul died on 23 May 2020 in a car accident that occurred during the night of Thursday to Friday in the Baldenheim sector, in the Alsace region of north-eastern France.

Honours

Player
Auxerre 
French Division 1: 1995–96
Coupe de France: 1993–94, 1995–96
UEFA Intertoto Cup: 1997

Saint-Étienne
French Division 2: 1998–99

References

1976 births
2020 deaths
French footballers
AJ Auxerre players
AS Saint-Étienne players
AS Cannes players
SR Colmar players
ASPV Strasbourg players
SAS Épinal players
Sportspeople from Épinal
Association football forwards
Ligue 1 players
Ligue 2 players
France youth international footballers
Road incident deaths in France
Footballers from Grand Est
20th-century French people
21st-century French people